Events from the year 1633 in Spain

Incumbents
 Monarch – Philip IV

Events

Births

 

 - Juan Antonio de Frías y Escalante

Deaths

 
 
 

 - Ana de Mendoza y Enríquez de Cabrera, 6th Duchess of the Infantado (b. 1554)

References

 
1630s in Spain
Years of the 17th century in Spain